Sahrawi Youth Union, also known as UJSARIO (its Spanish abbreviation for Unión de la Juventud de SAguia el Hamra y RIo de Oro), is the youth organization of the Polisario Front.

Organization
UJSARIO was founded in 1984 through the merger of Unión de Estudiantes Saharauis (Sahrawi Students' Union or UESARIO) and the Polisario Front Youth. It operates from the Sahrawi refugee camps in Tindouf, Algeria, organizing youth and students within the exile community, and promoting the interest of the youth within the POLISARIO and the Sahrawi republic.

The work of UJSARIO is divided in different national areas:
 Juvenile groups in the Wilayas, Institutions, Occupied territories and Europe.
 Union of Sahrawi Students (UESARIO).
 Organization and integration of the young women.
 Organization of scouts groups.
 Volunteer groups.

It has extensive international contacts with other youth political or cultural movements, especially in Spain, like the Spanish Youth Council or the Spanish Youth Organization. It is a full member of the Arab Youth Union, General Union of Arab Students, the World Federation of Democratic Youth, the International Falcon Movement - Socialist Educational International, the International Union of the Socialist Youth, the African Youth Union, the Pan African Youth Movement and the Youth for Development and Cooperation (YDC). It campaigns for a free Western Sahara, and tries to organize international youth exchanges and opportunities for refugee Sahrawis to study abroad.

From late 2005 to 31 December 2013 the General Secretary was Musa Salma. Since then, the General Secretary is Zain Sidahmed. In April 2012, Teceber Ahmed Saleh, member of the UJSARIO delegation, was elected as one of the African vicepresidents of the IUSY Presidium for the 2012–2014 term, at the IUSY World Congress held in Asunción, Paraguay.

Since 2006, UJSARIO organizes jointly with not-for-profit organizations a "Religious Dialogue for Peace" forum in the refugee camps, with presence of imams, priests, bishops and professors from Algeria, Austria, Canada, Great Britain, South Africa, Spain, Turkey and the United States.

In May 2013, UJSARIO and the Ittihaida Youth (the Moroccan party Socialist Union of Popular Forces youth) presented a joint resolution in the framework of the International Union of Socialist Youth World Council defending a peaceful, just, permanent and mutually-accepted solution that enables the self-determination of Western Sahara. At the same time, both organizations supported the UN mission to organize a referendum in Western Sahara.

Objectives
 Educate the Sahrawi human being free and worthy.
 Validate the young people dialogue according to reality.
 Participation of all the youth in the field of the struggle and construction of the liberation.
 Increase the amity links with all the organizations, councils, student groups and youth groups abroad, to spread the Sahrawi cause worldwide and cooperate mutually.
 Support the Sahrawi youth in the Occupied Territories and achieve that the human rights organizations and the media could visit them and destroy the media blockage imposed by Morocco, as well as guaranteeing the continuity of the work of the external organization.
 Persevere the personal-national resistance, and establish it as the fundamental base of the customs and traditions of the Sahrawi society.
 Attention to the childhood and the youth, as well as develop the work of the student groups abroad.
 Prepare the new generations of Sahrawi boys and girls, youth and students; train them and assure that they are ready to work for their people and it's just cause.
 Use of all the mechanisms for the continuity of the struggle and assume the future responsibilities in the government of a free and independent Sahara.
 Programming of activities that require the participation of the youth, and that coincide with the general objectives of the UJSARIO.

Sections

See also
National Organization of Sahrawi Women
Sahrawi Trade Union

References

External links
UJSARIO Facebook
UJSARIO - Dajla refugee camp section blog 
UESARIO Spain Sahrawi Students' Union in Spain 

Polisario Front
1984 establishments in Western Sahara
Youth organizations established in 1984